DGA may refer to:

Codes 
 Dangriga Airport in Dangriga, Belize (IATA Code: DGA)
 dga, the ISO 639-3 code for the Southern/Central Dagaare language

Organizations 
 Democratic Governors Association, a Democratic Party-affiliated organization of U.S. state governors
 Direcția Generală Anticorupție, the Internal Affairs directorate of the Romanian Ministry of Interior and Administrative Reform.
 Direction générale de l'armement, the French governmental organization for defence procurement
 Directors Guild of America, a motion picture industry labor union
 Dramatists Guild of America, an organization of playwrights, composers and lyricists.

Companies 
 Digital Group Audio, a privately held consumer electronics company based in Carlsbad, California.
 Disc Golf Association (DGA), a disc golf company

Science and technology 
 DGA, a series of planes built by Howard Aircraft Corporation
 Differential graded algebra
 Diglycolic acid
 Dissolved Gas Analysis, the analysis of gases dissolved in dielectric oils from high voltage transformers

Computing 
 Direct Graphics Access, an X Window System extension
 Domain generation algorithm, a family of algorithms used by malware to obfuscate their original Command & Control servers' IP address

Other uses 
 Data Governance Act, legislative proposal by the European Commission
Designer graphique agréé, a Canadian professional designation for graphic design
 Diego Garcia, island of the British Indian Ocean Territory, ITU country code
 Dietary Guidelines for Americans
 Digital Graphic Artwork (also D.G.A. abbrev.)